The Pospiviroid RY motif stem loop is an RNA element found in  Pospiviroids such as potato spindle tuber viroid (PSTVd).  The RY nucleotide sequence motif (5'-ACAGG and CUCUUCC-5') in PSTVd, is thought to bind with the tomato protein Virp1. The exact function of this motif and the significance of Virp1 binding is unknown. It is however thought that RY motifs are essential for establishing a viroid infection.

References

External links 
 

Cis-regulatory RNA elements